Onsen tamago ( or , lit. 'hot spring egg') is a traditional Japanese low temperature egg which is slow cooked in the hot waters of onsen in Japan. 

The egg has a unique texture in that the white tastes like a delicate custard (milky and soft) and the yolk comes out firm, but retains the colour and creamy texture of an uncooked yolk. This special texture is the result of the egg yolk and egg white solidifying at different temperatures. 

The egg is poached within the shell and is served with the shell removed in a small cup together with a sauce of broth and soy sauce.

Preparation 
After cooking, the shell is cracked open and the egg is served in seasoned bonito dashi (Japanese stock) for breakfast, or with a light sauce made with mirin, dashi and soy sauce with chopped spring onions sprinkled over the top.

References

Japanese cuisine
Japanese egg dishes
Egg dishes